The 1967 Rice Owls football team represented Rice University in the Southwest Conference (SWC) during the 1967 NCAA University Division football season. In its first season under head coach Bo Hagan, the team compiled a 4–6 record (2–5 against SWC opponents), finished seventh in the conference, and was outscored by a total of 175 to 164. The team played its home games at Rice Stadium in Houston.

The team's statistical leaders included Robert Hailey with 1,437 passing yards, Terry Shelton with 651 rushing yards, Larry Davis with 708 receiving yards, and Lester Lehman and Terry Shelton with 30 points each. Three Rice players were selected by the Associated Press (AP) as first-team players on the 1967 All-Southwest Conference football team: offensive tackle Leland Winston; defensive end Jay Collins; and defensive halfback Hugo Hollas.

Schedule

References

Rice
Rice Owls football seasons
Rice Owls football